is a Japanese anime screenwriter. After leaving Studio Ghibli, he was put in charge of screenwriting for Bunny Drop. Following its completion, he has worked on several series, some of which are Haikyu!!, Erased, and the remake of Fruits Basket.

Biography
Taku Kishimoto was born in Hyōgo Prefecture. After leaving Cyzo, Kishimoto worked for Studio Ghibli. At one point, he tried to get the role of head screenwriter for Arrietty, but he was ultimately not chosen by Hayao Miyazaki. After leaving Studio Ghibli, he was granted the position of head screenwriter for Bunny Drop.

In 2016, he did the screenwriting for Joker Game and Erased, both of which were nominated for anime of the year at the first Crunchyroll Anime Awards. Erased also won the award for best drama. In the Newtype magazine's awards in the same year, Joker Game won the Nogizaka46 award. In 2019, he did the screenwriting for the remake of Fruits Basket, which was nominated for best drama in 2019. Its second season won the award for best drama in the next year.

Works

TV series
  (2011) (screenwriter)
  (2013–2014) (screenwriter)
  (2014–2020) (screenwriter)
  (2016) (screenwriter)
  (2016) (screenwriter)
  (2016) (screenwriter)
  (2016) (screenwriter)
 91 Days (2016) (screenwriter)
  (2018) (screenwriter)
  (2019–2021) (screenwriter)
  (2019–2020) (screenwriter)
  (2020) (screenwriter)
  (2020) (screenwriter)
  (2020–2021) (screenwriter)
  (2021–2023) (screenwriter)
  (2021–2022) (screenwriter)
  (2022) (screenwriter)

Films
  (2016) (screenwriter)
  (2022) (screenwriter)
  (2022) (screenwriter)

Web series
  (2020) (screenwriter)
  (2022) (screenwriter)

References

External links
 

Anime screenwriters
Chiba University alumni
Japanese screenwriters
Living people
People from Hyōgo Prefecture
Studio Ghibli people
Year of birth missing (living people)